Christy McLoughlin (born 2 November 1954) is an Irish boxer. He competed in the men's welterweight event at the 1976 Summer Olympics.

References

1954 births
Living people
Irish male boxers
Olympic boxers of Ireland
Boxers at the 1976 Summer Olympics
Place of birth missing (living people)
Welterweight boxers